The North New Town Historic District, in Las Vegas, New Mexico, is a historic district which was listed on the National Register of Historic Places in 1983.

The district included 225 contributing buildings in a  area, about 15 city blocks.  The area runs roughly from National to Friedman, and form the alley between 2nd and 3rd to the alley between 8th and 9th Streets in Las Vegas.

It includes Bungalow/craftsman, Late Victorian, and Free Classic architecture.

References

National Register of Historic Places in San Miguel County, New Mexico
Historic districts on the National Register of Historic Places in New Mexico
Victorian architecture in New Mexico
Buildings and structures completed in 1879